Dangeau is a commune in the Eure-et-Loir department in northern France. On 1 January 2018, the former communes of Bullou and Mézières-au-Perche were merged into Dangeau.

Population

See also
Communes of the Eure-et-Loir department

References

Communes of Eure-et-Loir